James Stuart Geikie (c.1812 – Ormiston, 1884) was a Scottish wig-maker and perfumer remembered as an amateur musician and composer, and as father of two eminent geologists, James and Archibald Geikie. He composed the well-known song "My heather hills"

He ran a wig shop and perfumery from 35 North Bridge in Edinburgh's Old Town.

References

1810s births
1884 deaths
Scottish songwriters
Musicians from Edinburgh